The 2019 FINA Swimming World Cup was a series of seven three-day meets in seven different cities between August and November 2019. This edition was held in the long course (50 meter pool) format.

Meets
The 2019 World Cup consisted of the following seven meets, which were divided into three clusters.

World Cup standings
 Composition of points:
 Best performances (by meets): 1st place: 24 points, 2nd place: 18 points and 3rd place: 12 points;
 Points for medals (in individual events): gold medal: 12 points, silver medal: 9 points and bronze medal: 6 points;
 Bonus for world record (WR): 20 points. Tying a WR: 10 points.

Men

Women

Event winners

50 m freestyle

100 m freestyle

200 m freestyle

400 m freestyle

1500 m (men) / 800 m (women) freestyle

50 m backstroke

100 m backstroke

200 m backstroke

50 m breaststroke

100 m breaststroke

200 m breaststroke

50 m butterfly

100 m butterfly

200 m butterfly

200 m individual medley

400 m individual medley

4 × 100 m mixed relays

Legend:

References

FINA Swimming World Cup
FINA Swimming World Cup